Yuki Kato may refer to:

, Japanese wife of Pierpont Morgan's nephew
, Japanese Paralympic athlete
 Yuki Kato (actress) (born 1995), Indonesian actress
, Japanese footballer